Jackass Flats is a shallow alluvial basin located in the southwest portion of the Nevada National Security Site in Nye County, Nevada, United States. The area lies east of Yucca Mountain, south of the Calico Hills and Shoshone Mountain and northwest of Skull Mountain. The valley drains to the southwest via the Tonopah and Fortymile washes into the Amargosa Valley across US Route 95 at the town of Amargosa Valley, Nevada.

It is located mostly within Area 25 and extends into Area 14 and Area 26.

It was the test site of nuclear-powered rocket engines during project Project Rover and NERVA.

References

Nevada Test Site
Landforms of Nye County, Nevada
Basins of Nevada